Kynard is a surname. Notable people with the surname include:

Ben Kynard (1920–2012), American jazz saxophonist 
Charles Kynard (1933–1979), American soul jazz/acid jazz organist 
Erik Kynard (born 1991), American track and field athlete